Magnolia coco, the coconut magnolia, is a species of flowering plant in the family Magnoliaceae, native to southern China, Taiwan, and northern Vietnam. It is incorrectly called Magnolia pumila in some sources.

References

coco
House plants
Flora of South-Central China
Flora of Southeast China
Flora of Taiwan
Flora of Vietnam
Plants described in 1817